Dax is a commune in Nouvelle-Aquitaine, southwestern France, sub-prefecture of the Landes department.

It is known as a spa destination, specialising in mud treatment for rheumatism and similar ailments. Dax is also known for its tauromachy culture, especially during the August ferias, one of the most crowded festival events in France with 800,000 people attending over five days. It is also a market town, former bishopric and busy local centre, especially for the Chalosse area.

Geography
Dax station has rail connections to Paris, Hendaye, Tarbes, Bordeaux, Bayonne and Pau.

History
It was first established by the Romans, and its reputation is supposed to date from a visit by Julia, the daughter of the first Emperor Octavian Augustus. Its Roman name was Civitas Aquensium. In the Middle Ages, it was administered by viscounts until 1177. With the acquisition of Aquitaine by Henry II Plantagenet, later King of England, Dax remained under English rule until 1451, when it was conquered by French troops before the end of the Hundred Years' War. It successfully withstood a Spanish siege in 1521-1522.

Population

Climate

Sights

Roman archaeological crypt, including the foundations of a Roman temple from the second century AD
Remains of the Gallic-Roman walls (4th century)
Cathedral of Notre-Dame Ste-Marie
Church of Saint-Vincent-de-Xaintes
Fontaine Chaude ("Hot Fountain")
 Château de Dax, former castle where is now

Sports
The US Dax rugby club founded in 1904 is an important historical team, as many other town in south west of France. Many famous French rugby players comes from Dax and its suburbs such as Pierre Albaladejo, Raphaël Ibanez, or Richard Dourthe for example.

Twin towns
 Logroño, Spain

Personalities

See also
 Diocese of Dax
 Guiraude de Dax
 US Dax, a French rugby union club based in Dax.
 Dacquoise

References

External links
Official website 
Dax Cathedral
Dax Cathedral

Communes of Landes (department)
Subprefectures in France
Spa towns in France
Tarbelli
Gallia Aquitania